KKMP (1440 AM) is a radio station licensed to Garapan-Saipan, Northern Mariana Islands, simulcasting an Island Music format from the CNMI. The station is currently owned by Blue Continent Communications Inc.

References

External links
 KKMP website
 
 

KMP
Radio stations established in 1978
Garapan
1978 establishments in the Northern Mariana Islands
Island municipalities in British Columbia